Oceanian records in the sport of track cycling are ratified by the Oceania Cycling Confederation (OCC).

Men
Key to tables:

Women

References
General
Oceanian Track Cycling records 2 October 2019 updated
Specific

External links
OCC official website

Track cycling
Track cycling records
Track cycling
Cycling